The Germany women's national tennis team represents Germany in Billie Jean King Cup tennis competition and are governed by Deutscher Tennis Bund.

Current team

Correct as of 16 March 2023, rankings as of 12 March 2023.

History
Germany competed in its first Fed Cup in 1963. They won the Cup in 1987 and 1992, and finished as runners-up five times.

Finals

Players

Player records

Results

1963–1969

1970–1979

1980–1989

1990–1999

2000–2009

2010–2019

2020–2029

See also

Billie Jean King Cup
Tennis in Germany
Germany Davis Cup team
Germany at the Hopman Cup

External links

Billie Jean King Cup teams
Fed Cup